Governor of Córdoba may refer to 

Governor of Córdoba, Argentina
Governor of Córdoba (Colombian department)
List of Governors of Córdoba (Colombian department)